The Wilczyna is a mountain in the Owl Mountains, part of Central Sudetes. Its height is 665 metres above sea level. It lies in Owl Mountains Landscape Park.

The mountain is situated in Dzierżoniów County, Lower Silesian Voivodeship, in south-western Poland.

Mountains of Poland